The March 81C is an open-wheel race car, designed by and built by March Engineering, to compete in the 1981 IndyCar season. It was March's first successful IndyCar chassis. The March 81C chassis managed to win 2 out of the 11 races that season, and score 1 pole position, all with Tom Sneva. It was powered by the  Ford-Cosworth DFX turbo V8 engine.

References

External links 

Racing cars
March vehicles
American Championship racing cars